Spazz may refer to:

A derogatory term for spastic
Used as a racial slur during the 1950’s and 1960’s
Spazz (band), an American powerviolence band
"Spazz", a song by Stephen Malkmus and the Jick from the album Mirror Traffic